National Tertiary Route 939, or just Route 939 (or ) is a National Road Route of Costa Rica, located in the Guanacaste province.

Description
In Guanacaste province the route covers La Cruz canton (La Cruz district).

{
  "type": "FeatureCollection",
  "features": [
    {
      "type": "Feature",
      "properties": {
      },
      "geometry": {
        "type": "LineString",
        "coordinates": [
          [
            -85.639315,
            11.0699
          ],
          [
            -85.640183,
            11.069673
          ],
          [
            -85.640902,
            11.07086
          ],
          [
            -85.641686,
            11.072793
          ],
          [
            -85.64312,
            11.073435
          ],
          [
            -85.646322,
            11.07239
          ],
          [
            -85.648445,
            11.0729
          ],
          [
            -85.649584,
            11.073274
          ],
          [
            -85.650716,
            11.072473
          ],
          [
            -85.65331,
            11.072634
          ],
          [
            -85.656473,
            11.072756
          ],
          [
            -85.659272,
            11.07445
          ],
          [
            -85.660741,
            11.076302
          ],
          [
            -85.663837,
            11.077493
          ],
          [
            -85.668687,
            11.077852
          ],
          [
            -85.671942,
            11.07679
          ],
          [
            -85.675098,
            11.078093
          ],
          [
            -85.67895,
            11.078057
          ],
          [
            -85.68143,
            11.078407
          ],
          [
            -85.683426,
            11.077092
          ],
          [
            -85.686381,
            11.077217
          ],
          [
            -85.688265,
            11.076728
          ],
          [
            -85.690693,
            11.078659
          ],
          [
            -85.691763,
            11.079551
          ]
        ]
      }
    },
    {
      "type": "Feature",
      "properties": {},
      "geometry": {
        "type": "LineString",
        "coordinates": [
          [
            -85.691769,
            11.079575
          ],
          [
            -85.692384,
            11.079976
          ]
        ]
      }
    }
  ]
}

References

Highways in Costa Rica